Paracorupella pallida is a species of beetle in the family Cerambycidae, the only species in the genus Paracorupella.

References

Hesperophanini